Antohobe is a town and commune in Madagascar. It belongs to the district of Betafo, which is a part of Vakinankaratra Region. The population of the commune was estimated to be approximately 14,016 in 2018.

Primary and junior level secondary education are available in town. The majority 98% of the population of the commune are farmers, while an additional 2% receives their livelihood from raising livestock. The most important crop is rice, while other important products are beans and cassava.

Rivers
The town lies at the river Landratsay.

References and notes 

Populated places in Vakinankaratra